Diane Gale Dunrod-Francis (born 31 August 1968) is a Saint Kitts and Nevis former sprinter. She competed in the women's 400 metres at the 1996 Summer Olympics. She was the first woman to represent Saint Kitts and Nevis at the Olympics.

References

External links
 

1968 births
Living people
Athletes (track and field) at the 1996 Summer Olympics
Saint Kitts and Nevis female sprinters
Olympic athletes of Saint Kitts and Nevis
Place of birth missing (living people)
Olympic female sprinters